School Rangers (Rot Rong-rian School Rangers,   "School Bus: School Rangers") is a Thai variety and game show hosted by Atthaphan Phunsawat (Gun), Harit Cheewagaroon (Sing), Nachat Juntapun (Nicky), Wachirawit Ruangwiwat (Chimon), Korapat Kirdpan (Nanon), Tanutchai Wijitwongthong (Mond), Thitipoom Techaapaikhun (New), Weerayut Chansook (Arm), Tawan Vihokratana (Tay), Leo Saussay, Jumpol Adulkittiporn (Off), Nawat Phumphotingam (White), Kanaphan Puitrakul (First), Pirapat Watthanasetsiri (Earth) and Sahaphap Wongratch (Mix).

In every two-part episode, the show features a certain school in Thailand with its hosts visiting that school together with their guest Thai celebrities. Both then compete in various tasks and challenges along with the school's selected students who excel in their respective fields. At the end of each two-part episode, both show hosts and their guests turnover the proceeds of their fundraising activity to the beneficiary school. Produced by GMMTV, the show premiered in Thailand on 15 January 2018 on GMM 25 and serves as a sequel of High School Reunion.

Hosts

Current hosts 
 Atthaphan Phunsawat (Gun)
 Harit Cheewagaroon (Sing)
 Nachat Juntapun (Nicky)
 Wachirawit Ruangwiwat (Chimon)
 Korapat Kirdpan (Nanon)
 Tanutchai Wijitwongthong (Mond)
 Thitipoom Techaapaikhun (New)
 Weerayut Chansook (Arm)
 Tawan Vihokratana (Tay)
 Leo Saussay
 Jumpol Adulkittiporn (Off)
 Nawat Phumphotingam (White)
 Kanaphan Puitrakul (First)
 Pirapat Watthanasetsiri (Earth) 
 Sahaphap Wongratch (Mix)

Former host 
 Chatchawit Techarukpong (Victor) (Ep. 1–50)

References

External links 
 School Rangers on GMM 25 website 
 รถโรงเรียน on LINE TV
 
 GMMTV

GMM 25 original programming
Thai game shows
Thai television shows